This is a list of mosques in South Korea.

See also
 Islam in South Korea
 Lists of mosques

References

 
South Korea
Mosques